Tina Šutej (born 7 November 1988) is a Slovenian pole vaulter. She won bronze medals at the 2022 World Indoor Championships and 2022 European Championhips. Šutej earned a silver at the 2021 European Indoor Championships and again in 2023.

She took silver at the 2006 World Junior Championships. Šutej is the Slovenian record holder both in and outdoors.

Career
Šutej was born in Ljubljana and began competing in athletics at an early age, practising in a variety of events from the age of seven. A change of coach at her local club saw the arrival of a pole vault specialist, who encouraged her to focus on vaulting the high bar. She made her international debut at the 2005 World Youth Championships in Athletics and finished eighth in the pole vault final. Her first medal came the following year as she was the runner-up behind Zhou Yang with a Slovenian junior record mark of 4.25 m.

The next season saw her senior debut at the 2007 European Athletics Indoor Championships, but she did not progress into the final. Although she won an indoor and outdoor title nationally, she made little progress in her performances in the 2008 and 2009 seasons, in which a fifth place at the 2009 European Athletics U23 Championships was her international highlight. She enjoyed success in NCAA competition while studying at University of Arkansas, however, and she was the runner-up at the collegiate outdoor championships in 2009.

The 2010 saw her make improvements as she recorded a national indoor record clearance of 4.46 m in February and went on to claim the national title outdoors with a Slovenian record mark of 4.50 m. She was the runner-up in the First League section of the 2010 European Team Championships and came tenth in the final at the 2010 European Athletics Championships. Her 2011 indoor season saw her undefeated in eight competitions. She won at the 2011 NCAA Women's Indoor Track and Field Championship, having improved her best to 4.54 m in the weeks prior to the event. This was an American collegiate record and as a result Track and Field News chose her as its Collegiate Women's Indoor Athlete of the Year. She continued her form into the outdoor season, breaking the outdoor collegiate record and Slovenian mark with a clearance of 4.61 m to win the Southeastern Conference (SEC) title.

She competed at the 2011 World Championships and 2012 London Olympics without reaching the final, before reaching the final of the 2014 World Indoor Championship.  She competed at the World Championship in 2015, 2017 and 2019 and was a finalist at the 2016 Rio Olympics.

After seven years of no improvement, Šutej produced her finest season in 2019, equalling or improving her national record on five occasions, topped by a 4.73 m clearance in Velenje, Slovenia, on 15 September before capping her season at the World Championships where she reached the final.

She improved the national indoor record to 4.74 m indoors and 4.75 m outdoors in 2020. The following year, she tied for fifth at the postponed Tokyo Olympic Games and later improved her national record to 4.76 m in Ljubljana on 16 September.

On 2 February 2023, Šutej set the 30th Slovenian record of her career when clearing 4.82 m for a win at the Czech Indoor Gala held in Ostrava.

International competitions

1No mark in the final

References
 

1988 births
Living people
Slovenian female pole vaulters
Arkansas Razorbacks women's track and field athletes
Sportspeople from Ljubljana
Athletes (track and field) at the 2012 Summer Olympics
Athletes (track and field) at the 2016 Summer Olympics
Olympic athletes of Slovenia
World Athletics Championships athletes for Slovenia
Universiade medalists in athletics (track and field)
Mediterranean Games silver medalists for Slovenia
Mediterranean Games medalists in athletics
Athletes (track and field) at the 2009 Mediterranean Games
Athletes (track and field) at the 2013 Mediterranean Games
Athletes (track and field) at the 2018 Mediterranean Games
Universiade silver medalists for Slovenia
Competitors at the 2009 Summer Universiade
Medalists at the 2011 Summer Universiade
Athletes (track and field) at the 2020 Summer Olympics
World Athletics Indoor Championships medalists
20th-century Slovenian women
21st-century Slovenian women
European Athletics Championships medalists